Charidotella purpurata is a species of tortoise beetle in the family Chrysomelidae. It is found in North America.

References

Further reading

 
 

Cassidinae
Articles created by Qbugbot
Beetles described in 1855